Steve Watson (born April 9, 1982) is a former American football linebacker who last played for the Dallas Vigilantes of the Arena Football League. Prior to this, he played for the Tulsa Talons (one year) and the San Jose SaberCats (two years). He won an ArenaBowl with the SaberCats in 2007.

Watson played football at Missouri State University (then called Southwest Missouri State University) from 2001 to 2004. He was a starter during his final two years at the school; at the end of his collegiate career, he had tallied some 238 tackles and 11 sacks. Following the NFL Draft, in which he was not selected, Watson opted to join the San Jose SaberCats of the Arena Football League. Waston proved an instant success with the SaberCats; as a rookie he tallied 64 tackles (46 solo) as the SaberCats cruised to ArenaBowl XXI (where they defeated the Columbus Destroyers for their third AFL championship). Watson emerged as one of the league's best linebackers in his second season with the team; he was a First Team All-Arena selection at the end of the season.

Watson's career was interrupted by the league's 2009 suspension of operations. When the AFL resumed play one season later, Watson signed with the Tulsa Talons. Watson equaled his fantastic play from 2008; at the end of the 2010 season, he was again a First Team All-Arena selection. Watson signed with the Dallas Vigilantes in early 2011; he played in Dallas for one year. He has not appeared in any games since.

References

External links
Missouri State Bears bio

1982 births
Living people
American football linebackers
Missouri State Bears football players
San Jose SaberCats players
Tulsa Talons players
Dallas Vigilantes players
Players of American football from Missouri
People from St. Charles, Missouri